Alfred Achermann (born 17 July 1959 in Römerswil) is a retired track cyclist and road bicycle racer from Switzerland, who was a professional rider from 1984 to 1991. He represented his native country at the 1984 Summer Olympics in Los Angeles, California, where he won the silver medal in the men's team time trial, alongside Richard Trinkler, Laurent Vial and Benno Wiss.

References

External links
 

1959 births
Living people
People from Hochdorf District
Swiss male cyclists
Cyclists at the 1984 Summer Olympics
Olympic cyclists of Switzerland
Olympic silver medalists for Switzerland
Olympic medalists in cycling
Medalists at the 1984 Summer Olympics
Sportspeople from the canton of Lucerne
20th-century Swiss people